The track gauge adopted by the mainline railways in Ireland is . This unusually broad track gauge is otherwise found only in Australia (where it was introduced by the Irish railway engineer F. W. Sheilds), in the states of Victoria, southern New South Wales (via some extensions of the Victorian rail network) and South Australia, as well as in Brazil.

The Grand Duchy of Baden State Railway used this gauge between 1840 and 1855, as did the Canterbury Provincial Railways in New Zealand, until conversion to the  gauge in the 1860s.  The Launceston and Western Railway in Tasmania also used this gauge from 1871, until conversion to  gauge in 1888.

Different gauges 

The Ulster Railway (UR), taking the Irish Railway Commission's advice, used . The Dublin and Drogheda Railway was proposed to be built to  gauge on the grounds of lower costs. The two broader gauges were not used anywhere else.

This gauge was given legal status by the Regulating the Gauge of Railways Act 1846, which specified 4 feet  inches for Great Britain, 5 feet 3 inches for Ireland.

In 1846 the UR was re-gauged at a cost of £19,000 (about £ today) and the Dublin and Kingstown Railway in 1857 for £38,000 (about £ today).

The Hill of Howth Tramway and the Dublin and Blessington Steam Tramway adopted the  gauge. Dublin's Luas tram system, opened in 2004, uses .

Narrow gauge 

Numerous narrow-gauge systems were built, usually as three foot gauge railways. Most are now closed, including one of the largest narrow-gauge systems, that of the County Donegal Railways Joint Committee. The Irish narrow gauge today survives as heritage railways in both the Republic and in Northern Ireland. Bord na Móna uses narrow gauge in the Midlands bogs as part of its peat transport network. There is also a private peat railway on the southern shores of Lough Neagh in Northern Ireland, operated by the Sunshine Peat Company.

See also 
 History of rail transport in Ireland
 Irish gauge
 List of narrow gauge railways in Ireland
 Regulating the Gauge of Railways Act 1846

References

Ireland